Ponnani Taluk comes under Tirur revenue division in Malappuram district of Kerala, India. Its headquarters is the town of Ponnani. Ponnani Taluk contains Ponnani Municipality and nine gram panchayats. Most of the administrative offices are located in the Mini-Civil Station at Ponnani.

Overview
Ponnani Taluk is located right in the middle of the Kerala coast.

History

Ponnani was the most populous Taluk of the erstwhile Malabar District during its dissolution. At that time Ponnani Taluk had eight revenue blocks in it: Tanur, Tirur, Kuttippuram, Ponnani, Thrithala, Andathode, Chavakkad, and Nattika. On 1 November 1957, the revenue blocks of Tanur, Tirur, and Kuttippuram were separated from Ponnani Taluk to form Tirur Taluk, and the Revenue blocks of Chavakkad and Nattika were separated to form Chavakkad Taluk.

During the formation of Malappuram district on 16 June 1969, Ponnani taluk was separated from Palakkad district,Thrithala Revenue block was transferred from Ponnani Taluk to Ottapalam Taluk, and three villages of Andathode Block namely, Punnayur, Punnayurkulam, and Vadakkekad, were transferred to the Chavakkad Taluk.

Now, Ponnani is the smallest and least populous taluk of Malappuram district. The current Ponnani Taluk contains only 11 villages.

Villages 

There are 11 villages in this taluk:
 Ponnani Nagaram
 Veliyankode
 Maranchery
 Nannamukku
 Alamcode
 Vattamkulam
 Edappal
 Perumpadappa
 Thavanur
 Ezhuvathiruthy
 Kalady

Taluks of Malappuram

Ponnani Taluk under British Rule
Ponnani Taluk was created in 1860-1861 by merging Vettathunadu (Tanur) Taluk, Koottanad Taluk, and Chavakkad Taluk of erstwhile Malabar District. Kuttippuram region of Cheranad (Tirurangadi) Taluk was also added to Ponnani Taluk.
The Amsoms included in Ponnani Taluk was classified into five divisions- Vettathunad, Cheranad, Koottanad, Chavakkad, the Island of Chetvai . There were 73 Amsoms in the Taluk.

1. Vettathunad

Vettathunad, also known as the Kingdom of Tanur, was a coastal city-state kingdom in the Malabar Coast. It was ruled by the Vettathu Raja, who was dependent on the Zamorin of Calicut. The Kshatriya family of the Vettathu Rajas became extinct with the death of the last Raja on 24 May 1793. Vettathunad consisted of the following 21 Amsoms: 

 Pariyapuram
 Rayirimangalam
 Ozhur
 Ponmundam
 Tanalur
 Niramaruthur
 Trikkandiyur
 Iringavoor
 Klari
 Kalpakanchery
 Melmuri
 Ananthavoor
 Kanmanam
 Thalakkad
 Vettom
 Pachattiri
 Mangalam
 Chennara
 Triprangode
 Pallipuram
 Purathur

2.  Cheranad

The headquarters of Cheranad Taluk was the town of Tirurangadi which was merged with Eranad Taluk during the creation of Ponnani Taluk. Cheranad was directly ruled by the Zamorin of Calicut. Cheranad was scattered in Eranad and Ponnani Taluks. It consisted of the following 17 Amsoms out of which 11 were merged with Eranad Taluk. The remaining 6 Amsoms of Cheranad which was merged with Ponnani Taluk are given below:

 Valiyakunnu
 Kattipparuthi
 Athavanad
 Ummathoor
 Irimbiliyam
 Parudur

3. Koottanad

The second home of the Zamorin of Calicut was Thrikkavil Kovilakam at Ponnani in Koottanad. The Zamorin had control over the Koottanad.  It consisted of the following 24 Amsoms:

 Thavanur
 Kalady
 Kodanad
 Melattur
 Chekkod
 Anakkara
 Keezhmuri
 Pothanur
 Eswaramangalam
 Pallaprom
 Ponnani
 Kanjiramukku
 Edappal
 Vattamkulam
 Kumaranellur
 Kothachira
 Nagalassery
 Thirumittacode
 Othalur
 Kappur
 Alamkod
 Pallikkara
 Eramangalam
 Vayilathur

4. Chavakkad

Chavakkad had been under the suzerainty of the Zamorin. It consisted of the following 14 Amsoms:

 Veliyankode
 Ayiroor
 Kadikkad
 Punnayur
 Edakkazhiyur
 Palayoor
 Guruvayur
 Iringaprom
 Annakara
 Brahmakulam
 Mullassery
 Venkitangu
 Chavakkad
 Orumanayur

5. The Island of Chetvai

The Island of Chetvai had been earlier under the suzerainty of the Zamorin, but it came under the possession of the Dutch in 1717. It consisted of the following 7 Amsoms:

 Vadanappally
 Nattika
 Pallipuram
 Edathiruthy
 Kaipamangalam
 Pappinivattom
 Panangad

Ponnani Canal

Ponnani Canal was constructed for the transportation of goods from Ponnani to Tirur railway station. Here is a description about the Ponnani Canal by Basel Mission employees at Codacal.

Historic maps

See also 
 List of villages in Malappuram district
 List of Gram Panchayats in Malappuram district
 List of desoms in Malappuram district (1981)
 Revenue Divisions of Kerala

References

External links
 Official website of Ponnani Taluk

Taluks of Kerala